Transcription elongation factor A protein-like 4 is a protein that in humans is encoded by the TCEAL4 gene.

This gene encodes a member of the transcription elongation factor A (SII)-like (TCEAL] gene family. Members of this family contain TFA domains and may function as nuclear phosphoproteins that modulate transcription in a promoter context-dependent manner. Multiple family members are located on the X chromosome. Alternative splicing occurs for this gene; however, the full-length nature of all transcript variants has not yet been described.

References

Further reading